Akeira Kay Peters (born 30 September 1993) is a Grenadian cricketer who plays for Windward Islands as a right-arm medium bowler.  In May 2017, she was named in the West Indies squad for the 2017 Women's Cricket World Cup. She made her Women's One Day International (WODI) debut for the West Indies against New Zealand in the 2017 Women's Cricket World Cup on 6 July 2017. She made her Women's Twenty20 International (WT20I) debut for the West Indies against Sri Lanka on 19 October 2017.

In October 2018, Cricket West Indies (CWI) awarded her a women's contract for the 2018–19 season.

References

External links

1993 births
Living people
Grenadian women cricketers
West Indian women cricketers
West Indies women One Day International cricketers
West Indies women Twenty20 International cricketers
Windward Islands women cricketers